Barang is a Khmer word referred to France and "French" for something of, from, or related to France. It is often mispronounced as ba-réng. The correct pronunciation is bâ-râng, but pâ-râng is also acceptable. It is thought to be corruption of the word France but this may be a misconception. The term is related to the Thai term farang which has a similar meaning. In Malay, barang means "thing".

Khmer is the official language of Cambodia which was once a French protectorate called Cambodge in French. The French had many influences on the Khmer language, such as the pronunciation of Mercedes. Many technical terms used today in Khmer are of French origin.

In the Khmer language, the term barang has also become a non-pejorative word for a foreigner, particularly one of European ancestry, but some Khmer speakers might use it in a bad context. The term is becoming more popular now among travelers. It is even used by some expatriates living in Cambodia themselves.

Etymology
The origin of this word is debatable as there are several possibilities. One is that it came from Arabic via Malay traders. Another is that it came straight from French. Since Khmer phonology does not have the unvoiced fricative F, it is pronounced with the voiced plosive B. In many of Khmer's loanwords, an N often changes to an NG, as in the word Aleurmâng ("German") which comes from the French word Allemand.  The rarely used Khmer term "Barangsaes" also shows its relation to the word .

Usage
Barang is also used as a suffix in some Khmer words such as môn barang ("French chicken") which refers to a turkey as well as kh'teum barang ("French allium") which refers to an onion.

References

Khmer language
Ethno-cultural designations